Bryan Johanson (born 1951) is an American classical guitarist and composer.

Johanson was born in Portland, Oregon.

Johanson has performed, recorded and published works internationally. Johanson's works have won major awards from the St. Paul Chamber Orchestra, Aspen Music Festival and School, The John F. Kennedy Center for the Performing Arts, UCLA and The Esztergom International Guitar Festival. Johanson studied composition with Charles Jones and Pulitzer Prize-winning composer William Bolcom. Johanson's compositions feature three symphonies, concertos for violin, cello and piano, numerous chamber works, song cycles and choral works, as well as compositions for solo instruments including the classical guitar.

Johanson directed the guitar studies program at Portland State University from 1977 to 2015. During that time, he managed a successful concert series and later the Portland International Guitar Festival and Competition, a festival that earned worldwide recognition and attracted some of the finest players.

Johanson studied with the likes of Christopher Parkening, Alirio Diaz, and Michael Lorimer. He has performed with orchestras, chamber music groups, choirs, and in solo recitals throughout the United States and Canada.

In 2010, Johanson became a member of the Oregon Guitar Quartet, a group for which he has created numerous original compositions and arrangements.

Johanson currently lives in Portland, Oregon with his wife and daughter.

Works

Published works
 SONATA No. 4 for guitar solo. Les Editions D’OZ, Inc. Quebec City, Quebec, Canada. 2017 
 SONATINA-CAHIER for guitar solo. Les Editions D’OZ, Inc. Quebec City, Quebec, Canada. 2017
 A NIGHT AT THE THIRSTY EAR for guitar quartet. Les Editions D’OZ, Inc. Quebec City, Quebec, Canada. 2017
 PAINTED MUSIC for flute and guitar. Les Editions D’OZ, Inc. Quebec City, Quebec, Canada. 2017
 A GROOVE OF GUITARS for guitar quartet and orchestra. Les Editions D’OZ, Inc. Quebec City, Quebec, Canada. 2017
 LOS PEREGRINOS DEL CAMINO for guitar solo. Les Editions D’OZ, Inc. Quebec City, Quebec, Canada. 2016
 PICCOLLA SUITE ITALIANA for guitar solo. Les Editions D’OZ, Inc. Quebec City, Quebec, Canada. 2016
 ELEGY for guitar solo. Les Editions D’OZ, Inc. Quebec City, Quebec, Canada. 2016
 SONATA No. 3 for guitar solo. Les Editions D’OZ, Inc. Quebec City, Quebec, Canada. 2016 
 SONATA No. 2 for guitar solo. Les Editions D’OZ, Inc. Quebec City, Quebec, Canada. 2016 
 SONATA for guitar solo. Les Editions D’Oz, Inc. Quebec City, Quebec, Canada. 2013
 THE AUTUMN WIND - traditional Japanese arranged for guitar quartet. Editions D’Oz, Inc. Quebec City, Quebec, Canada. 2014
 JAVA BY STARLIGHT – traditional from Java arranged for guitar quartet. Editions D’Oz, Inc. Quebec City, Quebec, Canada. 2014
 MORNING DEW – traditional from China arranged for guitar quartet. Editions D’Oz, Inc. Quebec City, Quebec, Canada. 2014
 KALINKA – traditional from Russia arranged for guitar quartet. Editions D’Oz, Inc. Quebec City, Quebec, Canada. 2014
 OLIVES, LEMONS AND LAMB – traditional from Greece arranged for guitar quartet. Editions D’Oz, Inc. Quebec City, Quebec, Canada. 2014
 BERCEUSE – traditional from Catalonia arranged for guitar quartet. Editions D’Oz, Inc. Quebec City, Quebec, Canada. 2014
 JAMMUS AFRIKANUS – traditional from Zimbabwe arranged for guitar quartet. Editions D’Oz, Inc. Quebec City, Quebec, Canada. 2014
 BIALANDO EL GATO – traditional from Argentina arranged for guitar quartet. Editions D’Oz, Inc. Quebec City, Quebec, Canada. 2014
 LA SANDUNGA – traditional from Mexico arranged for guitar quartet. Eidtions D’Oz, Inc. Quebec City, Quebec, Canada. 2014
 A DOG FROM EVERY TOWN for guitar solo. Les Editions D’Oz, Inc. Quebec City, Quebec, Canada. 2013
 OPEN UP YOUR EARS for guitar solo. Les Editions D’Oz, Inc. Quebec City, Quebec, Canada. 2013
 I DREAMED ABOUT YOU LAST NIGHT for guitar solo. Les Editions D’Oz, Inc. Quebec City, Quebec, Canada. 2013
 BOPPIN’ for guitar solo. Les Editions D’Oz, Inc. Quebec City, Quebec, Canada. 2013
 THE PHILOSOPHER AND THE FLY for guitar solo. Les Editions D’Oz, Inc. Quebec City, Quebec, Canada. 2013
 MAGIC SERENADE for guitar solo. Les Editions D’Oz, Inc. Quebec City, Quebec, Canada. 2013
 ON ALL FOUR for guitar quartet. Les Editions D’Oz, Inc. Quebec City, Quebec, Canada. 2013 
 24 PRELUDES for guitar solo. Les Editions D’Oz, Inc. Quebec City, Quebec, Canada. 2012 
 BRETHEN, WE HAVE MET arranged from traditional material for guitar quartet. Les Editions D’Oz, Inc. Quebec City, Quebec, Canada. 2011.
 WHISTLING MOLLY arranged from traditional material for guitar quartet. Editions D’Oz, Inc. Quebec City, Quebec, Canada. 2011.
 BLACK IS THE COLOR arranged from traditional material for guitar quartet. Editions D’Oz, Inc. Quebec City, Quebec, Canada. 2011.
 HARD TIMES by Stephen Foster, arranged for guitar quartet. Editions D’Oz, Inc. Quebec City, Quebec, Canada. 2011
 THE SAINT JAMES INFIRMARY arranged from traditional material for guitar quartet. Editions D’Oz, Inc. Quebec City, Quebec, Canada. 2011
 RYE WHISKEY arranged from traditional material for guitar quartet. Editions D’Oz, Inc. Quebec City, Quebec, Canada. 2011.
 SHENANDOAH arranged from traditional material for guitar quartet. Editions D’Oz, Inc. Quebec, City, Quebec, Canada. 2011
 PICK A BALE OF COTTON arranged from traditional material for guitar quartet. Editions D’Oz, Inc. Quebec City, Quebec, Canada. 2011.
 LUX AETERNA for chorus and solo cello. Earthsongs Choral Editions. Corvallis, Oregon. 2010.
 AVE MARIA for chorus and piano. Earthsongs Choral Editions. Corvallis, Oregon. 2010. 
 LIQUID MUSIC for chorus and harp. Earthsongs Choral Editions. Corvallis, Oregon. 2010 
 THE MISTRESS AND THE BEE for chorus and piano. Earthsongs Choral Editions. Corvallis, Oregon. 2010
 O MAGNUMUM MYSTERIUM for chorus. Earthsongs Choral Editions. Corvallis, Oregon. 2010
 PSALLITE for chorus and piano. Earthsongs Choral Editions. Corvallis, Oregon. 2010
 PLUCK, STRUM AND HAMMER for guitar quartet. Editions D’Oz, Inc. Quebec City, Quebec, Canada. 2010
 SINFONIA by George Wagenseil, transcribed for guitar quartet. Editions D’Oz, Inc. Quebec City, Quebec, Canada. 2010
 DIVERTIMENTO IN Bb by Franz Joseph Haydn, transcribed for guitar quartet. Editions D’Oz, Inc. Quebec City, Quebec, Canada. 2010
 CONCERTO GROSSO III, OP. 6 by George Frederic Handel, transcribed for guitar quartet. Editions D’Oz, Inc. Quebec City, Quebec, Canada. 2010
 SINFONIA VENEZIANA by Antonio Salieri, transcribed for guitar quartet. Editions D’Oz, Inc. Quebec City, Quebec, Canada. 2010
 L’ENCOURAGEMENT, OP. 34 by Fernando Sor, transcribed for guitar duo with guitar ensemble. Editions D’Oz, Inc. Quebec City, Quebec, Canada. 2010
 SYMPHONY V by William Boyce, transcribed for guitar quartet. Editions D’Oz, Inc. Quebec City, Quebec, Canada. 2010
 TWO SONATAS by Domenico Scarlatti, transcribed for guitar quartet. Editions D’Oz, Inc. Quebec City, Quebec, Canada. 2010
 CLARINET CONCERTO by Johann Molter, transcribed for clarinet and guitar quartet. Editions D’Oz, Inc. Quebec City, Quebec, Canada. 2010
 SINFONIA, K. 76 by Wolfgang Amadeus Mozart, transcribed for guitar quartet. Editions D’Oz, Inc. Quebec City, Quebec, Canada. 2010
 SONATA IV, Op. 1 by Antonio Vivaldi, transcribed for guitar quartet. Editions D’Oz, Inc. Quebec City, Quebec, Canada. 2010
 TANGO, Op. 165 by Isaac Albeniz transcribed for guitar quartet. Editions D’Oz, Inc. Quebec City, Quebec, Canada. 2010
 LA FOLIA FOLIO for guitar solo. Editions D’Oz, Inc., Quebec City, Quebec, Canada 2008 
 CIACCONA for guitar solo. Guitar Solo Publication (GSP) Inc., San Francisco, California. 2007 
 VARIATIONS ON A FINNISH FOLK SONG for guitar solo in “Mel Bay Presents - The Contemporary Guitar: An Anthology of New Music, edited by Stanley Yates”. Mel Bay Publications, Inc. Pacific Missouri. 2001.
 O MAGNUM MYSTERIUM for chorus. Thomas House Publications. 1998. Winner of the 1997 Roger Wagner Center for Choral Studies Contemporary Choral Composition Competition. 
 AND THE DISH RAN AWAY WITH THE SPOON for solo guitar in "New Classical Guitar Music Volume 1: The Verdery Guitar Series". Frederick Harris Music * Publishers. Toronto, Ontario, Canada. 1996.
 BRING A TORCH, JEANNETTE ISABELLA arranged for cello and guitar from the traditional Christmas Carol. Earthsongs Music Publishers, Corvallis, Oregon. 1991.
 TWO CATS FUGUE for guitar and harpsichord. Columbia Music Company, Chapel Hill, North Carolina, USA. 1991.
 TOCCATA FESTIVA, Op. 46 for Guitar and Orchestra. Edizioni Musicali BERBEN, Ancona, Italia. 1990.
 MORTUA DOLCE CANO for solo Guitar. Columbia Music Company, Chapel Hill, North Carolina, USA. 1990.
 FRESCO I, Op. 33 for solo Guitar. Columbia Music Company, Chapel Hill, North Carolina, USA. 1990.
 FRESCO II, Op. 33 for two Guitars. Columbia Music Company, Chapel Hill, North Carolina, USA 1990.
 TIENTO VI, Op. 25 for two Guitars. Columbia Music Company, Chapel Hill, North Carolina, USA. 1990.
 SIMPLE SUITE, Op. 13 for solo Guitar. Columbia Music Company, Chapel Hill, North Carolina, USA. 1990.
 LABYRINTH, op. 30 for solo Guitar. Edizioni Musicali BERBEN, Ancona, Italia. 1985.

Commissioned Works

 THE BOOTLEGGER’S TALE for guitar solo. Commissioned by William Kanengiser with funding provided by the Augustine Foundation. 2018.
 PAINTED MUSIC for flute and guitar. Commissioned by Jeff LaQuatre and Michelle Stanley with funding from Metropolitan State University, Colorado for their 2017-18 concert season. 
 FIVE WAYS IN, ONE WAY OUT for clarinet in A and guitar quartet. Commissioned by Chamber Music Northwest for their 2016 Summer Music Festival.
 ESSERCIZI for piano solo. Commissioned by Portland Piano International, with the generous support of a Creative Heights Grant from the Fred W. Fields Fund of The Oregon Community Foundation. 2015
 SONATA for guitar solo. Commissioned by Michael LeFevre with funds from an anonymous donor.
 SONATE DE CHAMBRE for cello and piano. Commissioned by Cheryl Chevis.
 CATCH AND RELEASE for clarinet, alto sax, trumpet, trombone, electric guitar and piano. Commissioned by Festival “Agosto 2", Italy.
 FORE! for guitar quartet. Commissioned by the Oregon Guitar Quartet with funds provide by ArtBeat.
 FRESCO for organ and orchestra. Commissioned by the city of Bologna, Italy for their annual summer music festival “Agosto 2". 2008
 AS EVENING BECOMES MORNING for guitar solo. Commissioned by guitarist Louis O’Neill. 2008
 IF E WAS G for guitar solo. Commissioned by guitarist Louis O’Neill. 2008
 QUICK AS A WINK for orchestra. Commissioned by the Orchestra Filarmonica di Torino, Italia 2007
 DRINKING BREAKFAST FROM A JELLY JAR for guitar quartet. Commission by the Alexandria Guitar Quartet. 2007
 SONATA DA CAMERA for clarinet and guitar. Commissioned by Roger Cole and James Reid. 2007
 THE UNDERDOG for guitar and orchestra. Commissioned by Orchestra Seattle and the Seattle Classic Guitar Society. 2006
 RECESSIONAL for trumpet and organ. Commissioned by Robert Sandstrom and Lisa Day. 2006. A GRIMM LITTLE SUITE for 11-String guitar. Commissioned by Terry Schumaker. 2006
 THE MISTRESS AND THE BEE for choir and piano. Commissioned by the Southern Oregon Repertoire Singers. 2005
 BOPPIN’ for guitar solo. Commissioned by Travis Johnson. 2005
 CATWALK for guitar quartet. Commissioned by the Los Angeles Guitar Quartet. 2005
 LUX AETERNA for chorus and cello solo. Commissioned by The Portland Symphonic Choir with funding provide by the Argosy Foundation. 2005
 NOTES ON A VAULTED SKY for string quartet. Commissioned by Third Angle New Music Ensemble. 2003
 LET’S BE FRANK for guitar quartet. Commissioned by the Los Angeles Guitar Quartet. 2003 PLUCK, STRUM AND HAMMER for guitar quartet. Commissioned by the Los Angeles Guitar Quartet. 2003
 NO YOICKING, GABBLING, QUOTHING for penta armonica and guitar quartet. Commissioned by the New York Guitar Quartet. 2003
 LOS ABEJARUCOS for string quartet. Commissioned by Third Angle New Music Ensemble. 2003
 FRESCOES for oboe and trumpet. Commissioned by Robert and Lauren Murray. 2003 CONCERTO GROSSO for three guitars and string orchestra. Commissioned by the Alexandria Guitar Trio. 2002
 THE BANANA DANCE for two guitars and orchestra. Commissioned by Michael Kudirka and Eric Benzant-Feldra. 2002
 THE RED MARE SUITE for clarinet, violin, cello, percussion and balalaika. Commissioned by Third Angle New Music Ensemble. 2002
 THE RED MARE for clarinet, violin, cello, percussion, balalaika and guitar. Commissioned by Tears of Joy Puppet Theater Ensemble. 2002
 13 WAYS OF LOOKING AT 12 STRINGS for two guitars. Commissioned by Michael Kudirka and Eric Benzant-Feldra. 2002
 CIACCONA for lute or guitar. Commissioned by Martha Masters. 2002
 ORPHEUS WITH HIS LUTE for voice, lute, baroque flute and viol. Commissioned by Jacob Herringman and Catherine King. 2002
 SAKURA SAFARI for guitar trio. Commissioned by the Alexandria Guitar Trio. 2001 
 PARTITA for guitar solo. Commissioned by The Rosewood Guitar for Michael Partington. 2000 
 QUATRO SINKO for guitar quartet. Commissioned by the Los Angeles Guitar Quartet. 2000 THINK FAST for guitar solo. Commissioned by David Starobin. 2000
 DRAGON DANCE for guitar trio. Commissioned by the Virginia Guitar Trio. 2000
 PSALLITE for chorus and piano. Commissioned by the Portland Symphonic Choir. 2000. 
 BAGATELLES for solo cello. Commissioned for cellist Hamilton Cheifetz by friends of Mary Winch. 1999
 IN THE DEEP WOOD REFLECTED for viola and chamber ensemble. Commissioned by the Third Angle New Music Ensemble, Jeffrey Peyton, Artistic Director. Portland, Oregon. 1997
 STILL LIFE WITH 10 STRINGS for violin and guitar. Commissioned by Kevin Gary. Denver, Colorado. 1996
 TWANG for guitar quartet. Commissioned by the Alexandria Guitar Quartet. Fairfax, Virginia. 1996
 OPEN UP YOUR EARS for guitar. Commissioned by David Starobin. New York, New York. 1996
 IN THE DEEP WOOD REFLECTED for viola and orchestra. Commissioned by Anna Schaum. Portland, Oregon. 1996
 SONATA for solo cello. Commissioned by Cheryl Chevis for Hamilton Cheifetz. Portland, Oregon. 1996
 AVE MARIA for chorus and piano. Commissioned by the Portland Symphonic Choir. Portland, Oregon. 1995
 IN STILLNESS IN MOTION for violin, cello and piano. Commissioned by the Florestan Trio. Portland, Oregon. 1995
 LOS ABEJARUCOS for guitar quartet. Commissioned by the Alexandria Guitar Quartet. Fairfax, Virginia. 1995
 PICCOLO SERENATA for viola and guitar. Commissioned by the Alma Duo, San Francisco, California. 1995 
 Composed and performed music for PROMOTORAS, one of the shows that was part of the National Public Radio series 
 LEGACIES: TALES FROM AMERICA. 1994
 STRUM UND JAM for flute, clarinet, guitar, violin, and cello. Commissioned by the Third Angle New Music Ensemble, 1993
 MUTED IN THUNDER for mezzo-soprano, flute, percussion, guitar and female chorus. Commissioned by the Third Angle New Music Ensemble, 1993
 SIX ELECTRIC ETUDES for electric guitar solo. Commissioned by John Tamburello as required concert works for his electric guitar program at New York State University. 1993
 AND THE DISH RAN AWAY WITH THE SPOON for guitar solo. Commissioned by James Reid, Professor of Music at the University of Idaho. 1993
 AUTUMN BURNING for viola and guitar. Commissioned by the Alma Duo, San Francisco, California. 1992
 SUITE OF IMAGINARY BEINGS for flute, violin, viola, cello, and piano. Commissioned by the Northwest Chamber Players. 1992
 LIQUID MUSIC for mixed chorus and harp. Commissioned by Choral Cross-Ties. 1991
 A WEAVE OF SUNLIGHT for guitar and string quartet. Commissioned by David Tanenbaum for California State University's Summer Arts Festival at Humboldt State University. 1991. 
 HUMORS for flute, cello, and guitar. Commissioned by the Bel Arts Trio, Los Angeles, California. 1990
 SERENADE, for Viola and Piano. Commissioned by Oregon Symphony Violist, Stephen Price. 1990
 TRIO for Flute, Viola & Guitar. Commissioned by members of The Greater Portland Area Flute Society in memory of John May. 1990
 ROUNDELAY, for Men's Chorus. (Text by Samuel Beckett) Commissioned by the Portland Gay Men's Chorus. 1990
 TOCCATA FESTIVA, Op. 46 for Guitar and Orchestra. Commissioned by the Second American Classical Guitar Congress. 1989
 DUO, Op. 45 for Clarinet and Marimba. Commissioned by Jeffrey Peyton. 1989
 PARTITA, Op. 42 for Chamber Orchestra. Commissioned by The West Coast Chamber Orchestra for the inaugural concert of the Portland Center for the Performing Arts. 1988 
 AMERICAN FOLKSONG SUITE, Op. 41, for Electric Guitar and Wind Ensemble. Commissioned by John Tamburello. 1988
 OUTDOOR SERENADE for Electric guitar, electric piano, electric bass and two antiphonal percussionist. Commissioned by the Oregon Arts Commission and U.S. Bank. 
 SONATA, Op. 39 for guitar quartet. Commissioned by the Oregon Guitar Quartet. 1986
 METAMORPHOSIS, Op. 36 for guitar solo. Commissioned by Scott Kritzer. 1986
 FRESCO I, Op. 33 for guitar solo. Commissioned by the Guitar Foundation of America for their 1985 International Guitar Festival, held in Los Angeles, California at California State University, Northridge. The work was the required piece for the solo guitar competition. 1985
 FRESCO II, Op. 33 for two guitars. Commissioned by the Guitar Foundation of America for their 1985 International Guitar Festival, held in Los Angeles, California at California State University, Northridge. The work was the required piece for the guitar duo competition. 1985
 SONATINA, Op. 32 for flute, clarinet, and bassoon. Commissioned by Trio Viento. 1984
 LABYRINTH, Op. 30 for guitar solo. Commissioned by David Tanenbaum. 1983
 FRESCO for piano, percussion, electric guitar, and string orchestra. Commissioned by Oregon Ballet. 1981
 DOUBLE CONCERTO, Op. 14 for viola, guitar, and orchestra. Commissioned by the Whalter/Tanenbaum Duo and the Berkeley Promenade Orchestra. 1981
 IPHEGENIA IN AULIS, Op. 10 for viola and guitar. Commissioned by the Whalter/Tanenbaum Duo, Berkeley, California. 1979
 SONATA DA CHIESA, Op. 5 for oboe, french horn, and contrabass. Commissioned by Richard Sarpola for his graduate recital from the New England Conservatory of Music. 1979 
 TRIO, Op. 3 for flute, cello, and guitar. Commissioned by the Summerhill Trio. 1978

External links
Profile - Portland State University
Home - Web page
Art of the States: Bryan Johanson Open Up Your Ears (1997) for guitar
www.oregonguitarquartet.com/about/bryan-johanson/

American classical guitarists
American male guitarists
American male composers
20th-century American composers
1951 births
Living people
20th-century American guitarists
20th-century American male musicians